Valley Metro may refer to:

 Valley Metro in the Phoenix area of Arizona, United States
 Valley Metro (Roanoke) in Virginia, United States